Marija Jevđić (born 16 January  1981) is a politician in Serbia. She has served in the National Assembly of Serbia since 2014 as a member of United Serbia.

Private career
Jevđić is as economist based in Kraljevo. She is a mother of two daughters. Happily married since 2006.

Political career
United Serbia has contested every Serbian parliamentary election since 2008 as part of the Socialist Party of Serbia's electoral alliance. Jevđić first ran for the National Assembly in the 2012 election, receiving the fifty-fourth position on the Socialist-led electoral list; the list won forty-four seats, and she was not elected. She was promoted to the thirty-fifth position for the 2014 election and this time received a mandate when the alliance again won forty-four seats.

Jevđić was elected for a second term in the 2016 election after receiving the seventeenth position on the list; on this occasion, the Socialist-led alliance won twenty-nine mandates. She currently serves on the parliamentary committee on labour, social issues, social inclusion, and poverty reduction and the committee on the rights of the child; is a deputy member of two other committees; and is a member of the parliamentary friendship groups with Belgium, Denmark, France, Germany, Italy, and the United States of America. She is also a United Serbia member in the Kraljevo municipal assembly.

United Serbia has provided external support to Serbia's coalition government led by the Serbian Progressive Party since 2012, and Jevđić has served as part of the government's parliamentary majority since first being elected to the assembly.

References

1981 births
Living people
Members of the National Assembly (Serbia)
Politicians from Kraljevo
United Serbia politicians